Instituto Superior Técnico MHSE • MHIP (IST, also known colloquially as Técnico, and stylized TÉCNICO LISBOA) is a public school of engineering and technology, part of University of Lisbon. It was founded as an autonomous school in 1911, and integrated in the Universidade Técnica de Lisboa in 1930. IST is the largest school of engineering in Portugal by number of enrolled students, faculty size, scientific production and patents.

IST has three campi, all located in the Lisbon metropolitan area: Alameda in Lisbon, Taguspark in Oeiras and Tecnológico e Nuclear Campus in Loures, and consists of ten departments that are responsible for teaching the undergraduate and postgraduate programs. Each department is organized in sections, which group together specific subjects within its scientific area. In addition, the laboratories of the several departments support the teaching and research activities carried out at IST.

It offers 18 undergraduate programmes attended by more than 6,000 students—covering a wide range of areas of knowledge—including not only all the traditional engineering specializations, but also emerging scientific areas such as Biomedical Engineering, Aerospace, and Physics Engineering. Over 4,500 students are enrolled in 32 masters, 33 doctoral and several specialized programs. IST has produced 1292 PhD holders.

History 
Instituto Superior Técnico (IST) was created in 1911 from the division of the Instituto Industrial e Comercial de Lisboa, along with Instituto Superior do Comércio, currently Insituto Superior de Economia e Gestão. Alfredo Bensaúde, an engineer, was IST's first dean (1911–1922) and promoted a wide-range reform in the Portuguese higher technical education, including the first engineering courses at IST: mining, civil, mechanical, electrical, and chemical-industrial. IST's second dean was Duarte Pacheco (1927–1932), also an engineer, who was responsible for the construction of the campus at Alameda, designed by architect Porfírio Pardal Monteiro. Meanwhile, IST became part of the recently created Technical University of Lisbon. Throughout the following decade, the image of engineers from IST was projected into major engineering works, promoted by Duarte Pacheco, who was by the time Minister of Public Works.

Between 1952 and 1972, 12 study centres were established in Portugal, three of them at IST, in the fields of chemistry, geology and mineralogy, and electronics. These centres were responsible for promoting faculty training and scientific qualification through doctoral studies in universities and research centres abroad. In 1970, the minimum period for obtaining a bachelor's degree decreased from six to five years, and IST denoted a remarkable increase of the number of students. During this period, scientific research at IST increased significantly, through the creation of the Complexo Interdisciplinar which fasten together various autonomous research units, and contributes to transform IST in a reference school at European level.
In the 1990s, new degrees were created in cutting-edge engineering areas, including master and doctoral programmes. In 2001, IST inaugurated a new campus in the municipality of Oeiras, located in Taguspark, the first Portuguese science and technology park, which is home for more than 120 technology-based companies. In the academic year of 2006-2007, the Declaration of Bologna was successfully implemented for all IST programmes, aiming the establishment of a European Education Area to make Europe a competitive knowledge-based economy.
Today IST is involved with several of Portugal's R&D&I and technology transfer institutions and offers a vast number of degrees in science and engineering areas, at undergraduate, master and doctoral levels. IST is also part of several networks and international programmes to promote student mobility, both at undergraduate and postgraduate levels. Through a large number of agreements with other institutions worldwide, it participates in more than 20 Dual Master programmes, and joint PhD programmes with MIT, CMU, UT-Austin and EPFL.

Teaching

As of 2019, IST offers undergraduate and graduate studies in:
 Aerospace Engineering
 Applied Mathematics and Computation
 Architecture
 Biological Engineering
 Biomedical Engineering
 Chemical Engineering
 Civil Engineering
 Data Science
 Telecommunications and Information Networks Engineering
 Electrical and Computer Engineering
 Electronics Engineering
 Environmental Engineering
 Geological and Mining Engineering
 Industrial Engineering and Management
 Information Systems and Computer Engineering
 Materials Engineering
 Mechanical Engineering
 Naval Architecture and Marine Engineering
 Physics Engineering

IST is also actively involved in several networks and international programs to promote student mobility, both at undergraduate and postgraduate levels. Through a large number of agreements with other institutions worldwide, IST participates in more than 20 Dual Master programs, and joint PhD programs with MIT, CMU, UT-Austin, and EPFL.

Affiliations
IST is a member of several academic and scientific consortiums and associations, including:
 TIME association (Top Industrial Managers for Europe) for researchers and student exchanges and double-degree in Europe. T.I.M.E. Coordinator is Prof. José Santos-Victor.
 CLUSTER (Consortium Linking Universities of Science and Technology for Education and Research), a network of leading European Universities of Technology; their fundamental missions are advanced research and higher education of engineers, scientists and architects.
 Conference of European Schools for Advanced Engineering Education and Research (CESAER), a non-profit association of leading engineering universities in Europe and of Partnership of a European Group of Aeronautics and Space Universities (PEGASUS).

Academic rankings 

IST is among the most productive engineering schools in Europe, according to a 2019 ranking.

Instituto Superior Técnico - World's TOP 50 Eng Univ 2018

Instituto Superior Técnico. World's 8th Best Civil Eng Univ 2017

Locations and facilities

Currently IST has three campi:

Alameda campus, located in the centre of Lisbon, completed in 1929.
Taguspark campus, located in Oeiras, opened in 2000.
IST Tecnológico e Nuclear campus, the former Instituto Tecnológico Nuclear, located in Loures, transferred to IST in 2011.

IST benefits from an IBM supercomputer built in 2007, which is one of the most powerful in Portugal (1.6 TFLOPS as of 2007).

Notable alumni
IST alumni have held prominent positions in both the private and public sectors of Portuguese society, including several businesspeople, politicians, three Prime Ministers of Portugal, one of which became Secretary-General of the United Nations.
 
 Alfredo Nobre da Costa, Prime Minister of Portugal (1978), Minister for Industry and Technology (1975–76)
 Alberto Romão Dias, former State Secretary for Higher Education, university professor, chemical-industrial engineering (1964-2007)
 Ângelo Correia, politician and business administrator, chemical-industrial engineering (1968)
 António Câmara, founder and CEO of YDreams, Prémio Pessoa winner, researcher and professor at the Faculdade de Ciências e Tecnologia da Universidade Nova de Lisboa, civil engineering
 António Guterres, former Prime Minister of Portugal; former president of the Socialist International and former United Nations High Commissioner for Refugees; current Secretary-General of the United Nations, electrical engineering (1971)
 João J. R. Fraústo da Silva, former Minister for Education (1982–83)
 João de Deus Pinheiro, politician, Minister of Education, Minister of Foreign Affairs, Member of the European Parliament, European Commissioner, rector, university professor, chemical-industrial engineering (1970)
 João Pavão Martins, founder of SISCOG, full professor of Computer Science and Engineering at IST, mechanical engineering (1976) (later got a master's degree in computer science and a PhD in Artificial intelligence from State University of New York at Buffalo).
 José Manuel Bento dos Santos, businessman, trader, metals broker, cook, gastronomer, chemical-industrial engineering.
 José Manuel Tribolet, full professor of Information Systems, PhD from MIT, co-founder and chairman of INESC-ID, electrical engineering (1971).
 Luis Veiga da Cunha, Minister for Education (1979–80)
 Manuela M. Veloso, researcher in robotics, professor at Carnegie Mellon University
 Maria de Lurdes Pintasilgo, first woman to serve as Prime Minister of Portugal, chemical-industrial engineering (1953)
 Isabel Gago  the second woman to study engineering in Portugal and the first woman to teach chemical engineering (1939)
 Mariano Gago, Minister for Science, Technology and Higher Education, electrical engineering (1960)
 Nuno Maulide, full professor of organic chemistry at the University of Vienna at the age of 33 (2013) and Austria's scientist of the year (2018)
 Pedro Domingos, researcher in machine learning, professor at University of Washington, author of The Master Algorithm
 Pepetela, Angolan writer, sociology professor (did not graduate)
 Paulo Branco, film producer and distributor, chemical engineering (did not graduate)
 Raul Pires Ferreira Chaves, inventor, former Director of Public Works in Cape Verde and Portuguese Guinea, former president of Associação Industrial, Comercial e Agrícola da Guiné
 Stephan Morais, first Portuguese to be nominated a Young Global Leader by the World Economic Forum, civil engineering (1996).
 Vasco Joaquim Rocha Vieira, General and Governor of Macao, civil engineering

See also
University of Lisbon
Rádio Zero
FenixEdu
Air Cargo Challenge

References

External links
 Instituto Superior Técnico Home Page
 Universidade de Lisboa Home Page
 Mobility and International Cooperation Office (NMCI)
 "Study at IST"
 Rádio Zero Instituto Superior Técnico Radio
 Diferencial Instituto Superior Técnico Newspaper
 CinemaParaIST Instituto Superior Técnico Film Club
 Projecto FST Instituto Superior Técnico Formula Student Team

University of Lisbon
Engineering universities and colleges in Portugal
Educational institutions established in 1911
1911 establishments in Portugal
Modernist architecture in Portugal
Estado Novo (Portugal) architecture